Alfonso Blanco Parra (born 2 February 1986) is a Venezuelan professional boxer. As an amateur, he competed at the 2008 Summer Olympics and won the middleweight silver medal at the 2007 World Championships.

Amateur career

Blanco won the 2006 South America title against Carlos Góngora, at the 2007 Pan American Games he exited early against the same opponent.

At the world championships Blanco beat Darren Sutherland, Germany's Konstantin Buga and Olympic Gold medalist Bakhtiyar Artayev to reach the finals at middleweight where he was defeated by Russian defending champion Matvey Korobov PTS 4:29.

His record as of 2007 is 118:16.

World Championships results
Defeated James DeGale (Great Britain) 28-13
Defeated Vijender Singh (India) 13-8
Defeated Darren Sutherland (Ireland) 20-13
Defeated Konstantin Buga (Germany) 18-9
Defeated Bakhtiyar Artayev (Kazakhstan) 15-7
Lost to Matvey Korobov (Russia) 4-29

Olympic Games results
2008 (as a middleweight)
Defeated Argenis Casimiro Núñez (Dominican Republic) 18-7
Lost to Darren Sutherland (Ireland) 1-11

Professional career
He is signed to Oscar De La Hoya's Golden Boy Promotions.

Professional boxing record

{|class="wikitable" style="text-align:center"
|-
!
!Result
!Record
!Opponent
!Type
!Round, time
!Date
!Location
!Notes
|-
|13
|Loss
|12–1
|align=left| Hassan N'Dam N'Jikam
|KO||1 ||||align=left|
|align=left|
|- align=center
|12
|Win
|12–0
|align=left| Sergey Khomitsky
|UD||12 ||||align=left|
|align=left|
|- align=center
|11
|Win||11-0||align=left| Alvaro Robles
|UD||12 ||||align=left|
|align=left|
|- align=center
|10
|Win||10-0||align=left| Edwin Mota
|TKO||3 ||||align=left|
|align=left|
|- align=center
|9
|Win||9-0||align=left| Edison Garcia
|TKO||2 ||||align=left|
|align=left|
|- align=center
|8
|Win||8-0||align=left| Eddie Cordova
|TKO||5 ||||align=left|
|align=left|
|- align=center
|7
|Win||7-0||align=left| Leshon Sims
|UD||6 ||||align=left|
|align=left|
|- align=center
|6
|Win||6-0||align=left| Cleveland Ishe
|UD||6 ||||align=left|
|align=left|
|- align=center
|5
|Win||5-0||align=left| Juan Carlos Diaz
|UD||4 ||||align=left|
|align=left|
|- align=center
|4
|Win||4-0||align=left| Ricardo Malfavon
|UD||4 ||||align=left|
|align=left|
|- align=center
|3
|Win
|3–0
|align=left| Pablo Ruiz
|KO||1 ||||align=left|
|align=left|
|- align=center
|2
|Win
|2–0
|align=left| Gustavo Medina
|TKO||3 ||||align=left|
|align=left|
|- align=center
|1
|Win
|1–0
|align=left| Alfredo Riveira
|UD||4 (4)||||align=left|
|align=left|
|- align=center

References

External links

South America 2006

Living people
Middleweight boxers
1986 births
Sportspeople from Caracas
Boxers at the 2008 Summer Olympics
Olympic boxers of Venezuela
Venezuelan male boxers
AIBA World Boxing Championships medalists
South American Games gold medalists for Venezuela
South American Games medalists in boxing
Competitors at the 2006 South American Games
Competitors at the 2010 South American Games
21st-century Venezuelan people